Dialytellus is a genus of aphodiine dung beetles in the family Scarabaeidae. There are at least three described species in Dialytellus.

Species
 Dialytellus dialytoides (Fall, 1907)
 Dialytellus humeralis (LeConte, 1878)

References

Scarabaeidae